Mohamad Nafiizwan bin Mohamad Adnan (born 24 April 1986 in Kuala Terengganu, Terengganu), known as Nafiizwan Adnan and nicknamed The Komodo, is a professional squash player who has represented Malaysia. He reached a career-high world ranking of World No. 26 in May 2017.

He became the first ever Malaysian male squash player to claim a medal in the men's singles event at the Commonwealth Games after clinching the historical bronze medal for Malaysia in the men's singles event during the 2018 Commonwealth Games.

References

External links 
 
 
 

1986 births
Living people
Malaysian male squash players
Commonwealth Games bronze medallists for Malaysia
Commonwealth Games medallists in squash
Squash players at the 2010 Commonwealth Games
Squash players at the 2018 Commonwealth Games
Asian Games medalists in squash
Asian Games gold medalists for Malaysia
Asian Games silver medalists for Malaysia
Asian Games bronze medalists for Malaysia
Squash players at the 2010 Asian Games
Squash players at the 2014 Asian Games
Squash players at the 2018 Asian Games
Medalists at the 2010 Asian Games
Medalists at the 2014 Asian Games
Medalists at the 2018 Asian Games
Southeast Asian Games medalists in squash
Southeast Asian Games gold medalists for Malaysia
Competitors at the 2005 Southeast Asian Games
People from Terengganu
Malaysian people of Malay descent
Malaysian Muslims
Competitors at the 2009 World Games
Competitors at the 2017 World Games
Medallists at the 2018 Commonwealth Games